Patrick Curtis (1740 – 26 July 1832) was an Irish prelate of the Roman Catholic Church. He served as the Archbishop of Armagh and Primate of All Ireland from 1819 to 1832.

Biography
Patrick Curtis was born in Stamullen, County Meath in 1746. He studied for the priesthood in Salamanca in Spain. Curtis was the Rector of the Irish College in Salamanca, Spain and professor at the University of Salamanca, where he was known as Don Patricio Cortés. Whilst in Spain he was spymaster of a network that provided military intelligence to Wellesley's Anglo-Portuguese Army during the Peninsular War. His friendship with Wellington assisted in his promotion to Armagh. It is also thought to have paved the way to Catholic Emancipation, to which the Anglo-Irish Wellington was a late but genuine convert.

He served as Professor of Philosophy and the first Professor of Astronomy at the University of Salamanca.

After his return to Ireland, he lived on a British Government pension until he was appointed the archbishop of the Metropolitan see of Armagh by the Propaganda Fide on 2 August and confirmed by Pope Gregory XVI on 8 August 1819. His episcopal ordination took place on 28 October 1819.

He died in Drogheda of cholera on 26 July 1832 while still holding his archbishop's office.

Popular culture
He is featured in the Sharpe (TV series) where he is portrayed by the actor John Kavanagh.

References

Bibliography

 
 

1832 deaths
19th-century Roman Catholic archbishops in Ireland
Roman Catholic archbishops of Armagh
People of the Peninsular War
Infectious disease deaths in the Republic of Ireland
Deaths from cholera
Spymasters
Academic staff of the University of Salamanca
1740 births